The word cute is usually associated with the concept of cuteness, a form of attractiveness associated with youthful traits.

Cute may also refer to:

Music
 Cute (Japanese idol group), a Japanese idol girl group
 Cute (Maltese band), Malta's Junior Eurovision Song Contest 2007 entry
 Cute (album), by Arisa Mizuki
 "Cute", a song by Neal Hefti, popularized by Count Basie
 "Cute (I'm Not Cute)", a song by Blog 27
 “I’m Cute”, by Dot Warner in Animaniacs
 "Cute", a song by Jerry Goldsmith from the Gremlins 2: The New Batch soundtrack

Abbreviations and acronyms
 Copper(II) telluride, a chemical compound with the formula CuTe
 Qt (software), an application framework commonly pronounced cute
 CUTE-1.7 + APD, an amateur radio satellite operated by the Tokyo Institute of Technology
 China University of Technology, a private university in Taipei, Taiwan

See also
 Cutie (disambiguation)

it:Cute